All India Bank Officers' Association is the  national trade union centre of bank officers in India, was founded in 1981 on the 14th of February in Nagpur.

See also
All India Bank Employees Association

References

Trade unions in India
Finance sector trade unions of India
All India Trade Union Congress
Trade unions established in 1981